Charles Stephen Boreham (19 December 1857 – 15 May 1925) was a New Zealand shearer and trade unionist. He was born in Richmond, Tasmania, Australia on 19 December 1857.

He was potentially the first working class representative who stood for Parliament in New Zealand. At the time, a £10 deposit was due with each nomination, which was refundable upon the candidate receiving at least 10% of the vote, and it was speculated that he would have lost his deposit.

References

1857 births
1925 deaths
New Zealand trade unionists
New Zealand sheep shearers
Australian emigrants to New Zealand
Unsuccessful candidates in the 1899 New Zealand general election